Towzin Electric Kashan is a professional Iranian basketball club based in Kashan, Iran. The team compete in the Iranian Basketball Super League.

Roster

Coaches
  Majid Salehi Marzijarani (2008–2010)
  Vlado Đurović (2010–present)

Notable former players
  Slobodan Agoč

External links 
 
 page on Asia-Basket
 Roster

Basketball teams in Iran
Basketball teams established in 2008